Maurice Marcel Jacques Norland (30 July 1901 – 18 May 1967) was a French long-distance runner. He competed at the 1924 Paris Olympics in the 5,000 m and 10,000 m cross-country races and won a team bronze medal in the cross-country event.

References

1901 births
1967 deaths
French male long-distance runners
French male steeplechase runners
Olympic athletes of France
Athletes (track and field) at the 1924 Summer Olympics
Olympic bronze medalists for France
Sportspeople from Auxerre
Medalists at the 1924 Summer Olympics
Olympic bronze medalists in athletics (track and field)
Olympic cross country runners
20th-century French people